Shawn Hawk (born 17 May 1984) is a professional boxer from Crow Creek Sioux Tribe who fights in the light heavyweight division having previously boxed at Cruiserweight.

Professional career
Hawk turned professional in May 2004 at the 4 Bears Casino, North Dakota, United States. In his debut Hawk defeated Miguel Munoz by way of a first-round knockout. On July 10, 2009, Shawn Hawk lost to Matt Godfrey by unanimous decision.

Professional boxing record

|-
|align="center" colspan=8|23 Wins (17 knockouts, 6 decisions), 3 Losses (1 knockout, 2 decisions), 1 Draw 
|-
| align="center" style="border-style: none none solid solid; background: #e3e3e3"|Result
| align="center" style="border-style: none none solid solid; background: #e3e3e3"|Record
| align="center" style="border-style: none none solid solid; background: #e3e3e3"|Opponent
| align="center" style="border-style: none none solid solid; background: #e3e3e3"|Type
| align="center" style="border-style: none none solid solid; background: #e3e3e3"|Round
| align="center" style="border-style: none none solid solid; background: #e3e3e3"|Date
| align="center" style="border-style: none none solid solid; background: #e3e3e3"|Location
| align="center" style="border-style: none none solid solid; background: #e3e3e3"|Notes
|-align=center
|Loss
|
|align=left| Nathan Cleverly
|TKO
|8
|10/11/2012
|align=left| Staples Center, Los Angeles, California
|align=left|
|-
|Loss
|
|align=left| Eleider Alvarez
|UD
|12
|08/06/2012
|align=left| Bell Centre, Montreal, Quebec
|align=left|
|-
|Win
|
|align=left| Henry Buchanan
|UD
|10
|31/03/2012
|align=left| 4 Bears Casino & Lodge, New Town, North Dakota
|align=left|
|-
|Win
|
|align=left| Otis Griffin
|SD
|10
|20/10/2011
|align=left| Coeur d'Alene Casino, Worley, Idaho
|align=left|
|-
|Win
|
|align=left| Rubin Williams
|UD
|10
|17/07/2010
|align=left| 4 Bears Casino & Lodge, New Town, North Dakota
|align=left|
|-
|Win
|
|align=left| Anthony Greenidge
|TD
|8
|03/06/2010
|align=left| Coeur d'Alene Casino, Worley, Idaho
|align=left|
|-
|Win
|
|align=left| Donnell Wiggins
|KO
|2
|24/10/2009
|align=left| 4 Bears Casino & Lodge, New Town, North Dakota
|align=left|
|-
|Loss
|
|align=left| Matt Godfrey
|UD
|10
|10/07/2009
|align=left| Asylum Arena, Philadelphia, Pennsylvania
|align=left|
|-
|Win
|
|align=left| Jim Franklin
|KO
|3
|22/11/2008
|align=left| 4 Bears Casino & Lodge, New Town, North Dakota
|align=left|
|-
|Win
|
|align=left| Joshua Green
|KO
|2
|25/10/2008
|align=left| Township Auditorium, Columbia, South Carolina
|align=left|
|-
|Win
|
|align=left| Jim Franklin
|KO
|2
|13/10/2007
|align=left| Lode Star Casino, Fort Thompson, South Dakota
|align=left|
|-
|Win
|
|align=left| Bo Skipper
|KO
|1
|14/07/2007
|align=left| 4 Bears Casino & Lodge, New Town, North Dakota
|align=left|
|-
|Win
|
|align=left| Dennis McKinney
|KO
|4
|11/05/2007
|align=left| Clearwater River Casino, Lewiston, Idaho
|align=left|
|-
|Draw
|
|align=left| Ed C. Perry
|PTS
|8
|16/03/2007
|align=left| Seminole Hard Rock Hotel and Casino Hollywood, Hollywood, Florida
|align=left|
|-
|Win
|
|align=left| Karl Evans
|TKO
|1
|29/09/2006
|align=left| Camp Pendleton Marine Corps Base, Oceanside, California
|align=left|
|-
|Win
|
|align=left| Doug Kaluza
|KO
|2
|29/07/2006
|align=left| Qwest Arena, Boise, Idaho
|align=left|
|-
|Win
|
|align=left| Joe J. Evans
|KO
|2
|28/04/2006
|align=left| 4 Bears Casino & Lodge, New Town, North Dakota
|align=left|
|-
|Win
|
|align=left| Shane Fisher
|TKO
|2
|27/10/2005
|align=left| Coeur d'Alene Casino, Worley, Idaho
|align=left|
|-
|Win
|
|align=left| Paul Purcell
|TKO
|3
|08/07/2005
|align=left| Taco Bell Arena, Boise, Idaho
|align=left|
|-
|Win
|
|align=left| Ken Schomber
|KO
|1
|16/06/2005
|align=left| Coeur d'Alene Casino, Worley, Idaho
|align=left|
|-
|Win
|
|align=left| Paul Purcell
|UD
|4
|24/05/2005
|align=left| Northern Quest Resort & Casino, Airway Heights, Washington
|align=left|
|-
|Win
|
|align=left| Leo Bercier
|UD
|4
|15/04/2005
|align=left| Northern Quest Resort & Casino, Airway Heights, Washington
|align=left|
|-
|Win
|
|align=left| Greg Benson
|TKO
|1
|24/03/2005
|align=left| Coeur d'Alene Casino, Worley, Idaho
|align=left|
|-
|Win
|
|align=left| Moses Matovu
|TKO
|3
|25/02/2005
|align=left| Bank of America Centre, Boise, Idaho
|align=left|
|-
|Win
|
|align=left| Leonard Sims
|KO
|4
|04/02/2005
|align=left| Quinault Resort & Casino, Ocean Shores, Washington
|align=left|
|-
|Win
|
|align=left| Neil Stephens
|KO
|1
|02/12/2004
|align=left| Northern Quest Resort & Casino, Airway Heights, Washington
|align=left|
|-
|Win
|
|align=left| Miguel "Double M" Munoz
|TKO
|1
|15/05/2004
|align=left| 4 Bears Casino & Lodge, New Town, North Dakota
|align=left|
|}

References

External links
 

Boxers from South Dakota
Native American boxers
Living people
1984 births
Sportspeople from Sioux Falls, South Dakota
Cruiserweight boxers
American male boxers